This article lists events that occurred during 1994 in Estonia.

Incumbents

Events
The Russian army left Estonia.
28 September – Sinking of the MS Estonia: the car ferry MS Estonia sank in the Baltic Sea, killing 852.

Births

Deaths

See also
 1994 in Estonian football
 1994 in Estonian television

References

 
1990s in Estonia
Estonia
Estonia
Years of the 20th century in Estonia